Phaeochrous compactus, is a species of scavenger scarab beetle endemic to Sri Lanka.

Description
Body length of male is about 8.2 to 9 mm. There are 13 to 20 denticles, and regular striae. The 5th, 9th and 13th interstriae are very weakly heterogeneous. Elytra opaque. In genitalia, left paramere is relatively short, and somewhat triangular. Right paramere consists with well defined ridges and excavations on the external lateral face. Pronotal disc is not completely shining.

References 

Scarabaeiformia
Insects of Sri Lanka
Insects described in 1978